Dragonball Evolution is a fighting video game for the PlayStation Portable based on the live-action film of the same name. The game was released in March 2009 in Japan, followed by a North American release on April 8, 2009. It is the first Dragon Ball video game to feature Bulma as a playable character.

Gameplay
The gameplay is very similar to that of its ancestor, Dragon Ball Z Shin Budokai 2. It was developed by Dimps, the same creators of Dragon Ball Z: Shin Budokai and Dragon Ball Z: Shin Budokai: Another Road. Same rush attacks, Same Commands, and same Gameplay/Engine.

Plot

Characters
 Goku
 Bulma
 Roshi
 Yamcha
 Chi-chi
 Grandpa Gohan
 Piccolo
 Mai
 Neo Piccolo
 Fu-Lum
 Great Ape Goku (Oozaru)

Reception

The game received "unfavorable" reviews according to video game review aggregator Metacritic. IGN called it a "pile of trash," "disaster burned onto a UMD," and "competitor for the worst game on the PSP." Reviewers noted that pressing the same button repeatedly was sufficient to win battles against the AI in the game's story mode, while adding an Ultimate Attack to the mix was similarly effective in the arcade mode. GamePro gave the game a moderate review, writing, "despite horrible graphics, spotty A.I., and some severely unbalanced characters, Dragon Ball Evolution on PSP at least delivers fast action and multiple modes of play." In Japan, Famitsu gave it a much better score of one seven, one six, and two sevens, for a total of 27 out of 40. The game was included among the worst games of all time by GamesRadar in 2014.

References

Notes

2009 video games
20th Century Studios video games
Bandai Namco games
Dimps games
Evolution
Multiplayer and single-player video games
PlayStation Portable games
PlayStation Portable-only games
Video games based on films
Video games developed in Japan